Vissa is an Indian Telugu-language television channel part of Raj Network. It was launched on 23 June 2003. Four brothers started Raj TV in 1994. The channel telecast some non-Telugu films which are dubbed from south language Tamil. The channel is named after their mother Vissalakshmi. It broadcasts mostly film based programs, pre-release events, interviews, news and talk shows.

List of films
Nagamma Naidu
Vaaliddaru
Premante Pranamistha
Usha Kiranalu
Hello My Dear Monisha
Manthrikudu Maharaju
Sivaputrudu
Seetha Geetha Dhatithe
Picnic
Iddaru Mitrulu
Agnikeratulu
Sri Krishnadevarayalu
Mosagadu
Amma Nanna
Jyothi
Prema Bandham
Golconda Abbulu
Prabhanjanam

Availability 
The channel in considered in Telugu language TV channels but due to some reasons most of DTH service are not adapted this channel so, currently this channel is available only in Airtel digital TV and Tata Play.

Sister Channel

 Raj Musix Telugu
 Raj News Telugu
 Raj TV
 Raj Digital Plus
 Raj Musix
 Raj Musix Kannada
 Raj News Kannada
 Raj Musix Malayalam
 Raj News Malayalam

References

Telugu-language television channels
Television channels and stations established in 2003
Television stations in Hyderabad